Wool moth may refer to two distinct moths:
 The Australian moth  Monopis icterogastra, which look "woolly".
 The cosmopolitan moth Tineola bisselliella, which eats wool cloth.

Animal common name disambiguation pages